The Embassy of Finland to the Commonwealth of Australia is Finland's diplomatic mission in Canberra, Australia.  The mission is also accredited to New Zealand, Fiji, Papua New Guinea, Samoa, Tonga, Vanuatu and the Solomon Islands. As it is the only Finnish Embassy in the Southern Pacific region (Oceania) in practice the Embassy also represents Finland in its relations with other Pacific island states in the region (Nauru, Tuvalu as well as the Cook Islands, Niue and Tokelau).

History
Finland first established a consulate in Sydney in 1918. In these early years, the consulate, apart from providing consular services, also played the role of a social club for the Australian Finnish community. After relations become tense between Finland and Great Britain in 1941, as a result of the Continuation War between the Soviet Union and Finland, representatives of the Finnish government returned to their home country.

In 1949, Finland and Australia began diplomatic relations. The relationship between the two countries was quickly established after the war and ties between Australia and Finland became stronger and deeper. In the 1950s, Finnish exports doubled from the previous decade. The Consulate of Finland remained in Sydney until 1966 when it was moved to the capital city of Canberra, and in 1968 the first Finnish ambassador was appointed. The Finnish embassy was built in Yarralumla in 1978, adjacent to the Singaporean and Indonesian missions.  Finland continued to maintain a separate consulate in the Sydney suburb of Double Bay until 2012.

Architecture
In 2002 a distinctively built annex was built, designed by Finnish architect Vesa Huttunen of Hirvonen and Huttunen who won the commission in a 1997 competition. The annex houses the chancery, a residence for the Counsellor and a Finnish sauna.  The 1978 building now serves as the Ambassadorial residence.

The building appears as a long, sleek box of stainless steel and glass, neatly complemented by the overhang of indigenous eucalyptus trees. Named Ilmarinen after the Finnish armoured naval vessel (in turn named after the blacksmith hero in the Finnish national epic Kalevala), the building has the spatial feel of a ship.  Offices sit like cabins lined up along the side of the building, connected by walkways overlooking an atrium. The facade of the chancery building is made entirely of glass.  Interior steel I-beams and stainless steel padding is used alongside recycled jarrah timber external decks and stair treads which look as if they came from a disused wharf (actually they originate from Australian sheep stations). The design received an award at the annual architectural competition held in the Australian Capital Territory in the summer of 2003.

The Embassy of Estonia to Australia has been located in the Embassy of Finland building since August 2015.

Finnish Ambassadors to Australia

Honorary Consulates
In addition to the Embassy in Canberra, there are eight honorary consulates in Sydney, Melbourne, Brisbane, Perth, Adelaide, Perth, Darwin and Cairns. Honorary consuls are also based in New Zealand, Fiji, Papua New Guinea, Samoa and Tonga. Within his or her jurisdiction, an honorary consul provides advice and guidance for distressed Finnish citizens and foreigners permanently residing in Finland who are temporarily abroad, assisting them in their contacts with local authorities or the nearest Finnish embassy. Certain types of notarized certificates can be acquired through an honorary consul. Honorary consuls do not accept passport applications nor do they handle matters pertaining to visas or residence permits.

See also
 Ministry of Foreign Affairs (Finland)
 List of diplomatic missions of Finland
 List of diplomatic missions in Australia
 Visa requirements for Finnish citizens
 Visa policy of Australia

References

External links

Finland
Canberra
Buildings and structures by Finnish architects
Australia–Finland relations
Buildings and structures completed in 1978